USCGC Klamath (WHEC-66) was an Owasco-class high endurance cutter built for World War II service with the United States Coast Guard. The war ended before the ship was completed and consequently Klamath did not see wartime service until the Vietnam War.

Klamath was built by Western Pipe & Steel at the company's San Pedro shipyard. Named after Klamath Lake, Oregon, she was commissioned as a patrol gunboat with ID number WPG-66 on 19 June 1946. Her ID was later changed to WHEC-66 (HEC for "High Endurance Cutter" - the "W" signifies a Coast Guard vessel).

Peacetime service
Klamath was homeported at Seattle, Washington, from 19 June 1946 to 1 May 1973. She was used for law enforcement, ocean station, and search and rescue operations in the Pacific. Additionally, she also conducted Bering Sea Patrol annually.

From 20 to 24 March 1966, she inspected the Soviet MV Olyturka, which had sought haven in U.S. waters following a casualty. On 25 March 1966, the Japanese FV's Bansho Maru No. 38 and Tenyo Maru No. 3 were discovered in U.S. waters and escorted out.
 January 1972, Klamath was dispatched from Alaskan patrol to render assistance to the Japanese
 freighter Tenzan Maru, which was taking on water 800 miles west of Seattle.   Klamath crew
 boarded the Tenzan Maru and installed temporary repairs, then escorted the freighter to
 San Francisco.

Vietnam War
Klamath was assigned to Coast Guard Squadron Three, South Vietnam, from 14 May 1969 to 31 January 1970.

Return to peacetime duties
In February 1972, a boarding party from Klamath helped save the badly damaged MV Tenzan Maru and she was subsequently escorted to safety.

Decommissioning
Klamath was decommissioned on 1 May 1973 and was sold for scrap on 18 November 1974.

Footnotes

References
 Klamath WHEC-66, United States' Coast Guard website.
 Scheina, Robert L.: U.S. Coast Guard Cutters & Craft of World War II Annapolis: Naval Institute Press, 1981, pp. 1–3.
 Scheina, Robert L.: U.S. Coast Guard Cutters & Craft, 1946-1990 Annapolis: Naval Institute Press, 1990, pp. 18–26.

 

Owasco-class cutters
Ships of the United States Coast Guard
Vietnam War patrol vessels of the United States
Ships built in Los Angeles
1945 ships